Huỳnh Tấn Phát (15 February 1913, near Mỹ Tho, French Indochina – 30 September 1989, Ho Chi Minh City, Vietnam) was a Vietnamese architect, politician and revolutionary. He was the Chairman of the Provisional Revolutionary Government of South Vietnam during the Vietnam War. After unification, Phát became Deputy Prime Minister and Minister of Construction before serving as Vice President of Vietnam until his death. He is the designer of the flag of the Viet Cong.

Early life and education 
He studied architecture at the University of Hanoi. In 1940, he became the first Vietnamese architect to open a private architectural office in Saigon. In 1941, he won the first prize in the design contest of the Indochina Exhibition and Convention Center organized by the Governor General of Indochina Jean Decoux. He is the designer of many iconic villas in District 1, Ho Chi Minh City.

Phát later became an editor of the anti-French magazine Jeunesse (Youth) and a co-founder of the Vanguard Youth movement.

Career 
Huỳnh Tấn Phát joined the Indochinese Communist Party in March 1945, and began revolutionary activities in Saigon, whereupon he was appointed Deputy Director of the Information and Press Committee for Southern Vietnam. He was a member of the First National Assembly of the Democratic Republic of Vietnam.

When the French re-occupied Saigon after World War II, he was arrested and sentenced to two years in prison. Upon his release, Phát resumed his revolutionary activities and in 1949 was appointed a Commissioner of the Administrative Resistance Committee for Southern Vietnam and directly managed the Free Voice of Saigon-Cho Lon Radio.

He later emerged as a leading chief theoretician of the Viet Cong (formally the National Liberation Front). Phát became Chairman of the Provisional Revolutionary Government of the Republic of South Vietnam (PRG) on its formation in 1969. Upon the surrender of the Republic of Vietnam government on 30 April 1975, the PRG became the nominal government of South Vietnam. He held this post until 2 July 1976, when the country was reunified with the North, making him the only communist South Vietnamese prime minister. From 1976 to 1982, he was a vice premier in Vietnam. In 1982, he became the Vice President of the Council of State and served in this position until his death in 1989. Between 1983 and 1988, Phát was also the Chairman of the Vietnamese Fatherland Front, a political coalition that included the Communist Party of Vietnam, the Democratic Party of Vietnam and the Socialist Party of Vietnam.

Legacy 
For his devotion to the communist cause, he was awarded the Order of Ho Chi Minh. Huỳnh Tấn Phát died 1989 in Ho Chi Minh City at the age of 76. Many streets in Vietnamese cities and provinces have been named after him.

Notes

References

1913 births
1989 deaths
People from Bến Tre Province
Vice presidents of Vietnam
Vietnamese people of the Vietnam War
Communist Party of Vietnam politicians
Deputy Prime Ministers of Vietnam
Vietnamese nationalists
Vietnamese revolutionaries